Bathymodiolus marisindicus is a species of deepwater hydrothermal vent mussel, a marine bivalve mollusk species in the family Mytilidae, the mussels. This species is found in the Indian Ocean.

Description
In this species of Bathymodiolus, the inner mantle fusion is lacking, and there is a very short valvular siphonal membrane. The species can be distinguished from other species in the same genus by the length of the foot, the height to length ratio and thickness of the shell and the fact that the umbones are not at the very tip of the shell. Other distinguishing features are the length and strength of the ligament, and the unique positions of the anterior retractor muscle scar and the anterior bundle scar of the posterior byssal retractor muscle, on the inside of the shell surface.

References

External links

marisindicus
Molluscs described in 2001